Wheeler High School may refer to:

Wheeler High School (Connecticut) — North Stonington, Connecticut
Wheeler High School (Indiana) — Valparaiso, Indiana
Wheeler High School (Fossil, Oregon)
Wheeler Central High School — Bartlett, Nebraska
Wheeler High School (Georgia) — Marietta, Georgia
Wheeler High School (Mississippi) — Booneville, Mississippi
Wheeler High School (Texas) — Wheeler, Texas

See also
 Wheeler School